Dragon Award may refer to:

 Blue Dragon Film Awards, awarded to films by the South Korean newspaper Sports Chosun
 Dragon Awards for science-fiction and fantasy works, awarded annually at Dragon Con since 2016
 One of several Dragon film awards awarded annually at the Gothenburg Film Festival